Rabat is the capital city of Morocco. 

Rabat may also refer to:

Places

France
 Rabat-les-Trois-Seigneurs, Ariège

Iran
 Rabat, Iran, a city in West Azerbaijan Province
 Rabat, Urmia, a village in West Azerbaijan Province

Jordan (ancient Transjordan)
 Rabbath Ammon, the capital of ancient Ammon; today's Amman
 Rabbath Moab, the capital of ancient Moab; today's Rabba

Malta
 Rabat, Malta, a city on Malta Island
 Victoria, Gozo, a city on Gozo Island, often referred to by its original name Rabat

Pakistan
 Rabat, Battagram, town and union council (district)
 Rabat, Lower Dir, union council (district)

Turkey
 Yeni Rabat, Turkish name of medieval Georgian monastery of Shatberdi from Klarjeti

Ukraine (Crimea)
 Arabat Fortress

Uzbekistan
 Rabat Malik, or Ribat-i Malik, a ruined caravanserai on the road from Samarkand to Bukhara

Other uses
 Rabat (clothing), a type of waistcoat worn by certain Catholic clergy
 Rabat (film), a 2011 Dutch film
 Rabat (military rank) (Hebrew acronym), rank in the Israeli army, equivalent to a corporal
 Rabat I (c. 1616–c. 1644/5), ruler of the Kingdom of Sennar
 FUS Rabat, a Moroccan football club

See also
 Rabad, an alternate spelling common in Central Asia
 Ribat, Arabic word for Early Muslim frontier fort, later caravansary and Sufi retreat
 Robat (disambiguation), the Persian variant of ribat